Lone Survivor: The Eyewitness Account of Operation Redwing and the Lost Heroes of SEAL Team 10 (2007) is a non-fiction book written by Marcus Luttrell with assistance from novelist and ghostwriter Patrick Robinson and published by Little, Brown and Company. The narrative takes place in Afghanistan, where the reader follows Marcus Luttrell and a group of U.S. Navy SEALs. It has since seen a 2013 film adaptation of the same name, with Mark Wahlberg starring as Luttrell.

Synopsis
At the beginning of the book, Marcus Luttrell describes his childhood and his training to prepare for the Navy SEALs with Billy Shelton. After joining the U.S. Navy and completing SEAL training, Luttrell describes his posting in Afghanistan, in the Hindu Kush mountains of the Kunar province. With him are the rest of SDVT-1 (SEAL Delivery Vehicle Team 1), except Shane E. Patton, for whom Danny Dietz was substituted. Their mission, Operation Red Wings, was to capture or kill a leading Taliban member thought to be allied with Osama bin Laden.

At an early stage of their mission, the team encountered three goatherds, including a boy. They debated whether they should kill the goatherds to avoid being exposed to the enemy, but after a vote, team leader Michael Murphy decided to uphold the rules of engagement and let the goatherds go. About an hour later, the four SEALs were surrounded by a number of Taliban warriors. The New York Times sums up the story:  Hospitality as understood by the Pashtun culture is a central theme.

Reception
Reviews of the book have been mostly positive. Conservative commentators Glenn Beck and Michelle Malkin have spoken their support. The book was also showcased on NBC's The Today Show and CNN. The Washington Post wrote: "If you're looking for a true story that showcases both American heroism and Afghani [sic] humanity, Marcus Luttrell's Lone Survivor ... may be the book for you." The book became a New York Times Bestseller. The New York Times review was laudatory, but also noted, "Along with the tragic story about how Mr. Luttrell lost his comrades, the book is spiked with unabashed braggadocio and patriotism, as well as several polemical passages lashing out at the 'liberal media' for its role in sustaining military rules of engagement that prevent soldiers from killing unarmed civilians who may also be scouts or informers for terrorists."

Accuracy

There has been some debate about the exact number of Taliban forces involved in the engagement. In Luttrell's own official after-action report filed with his superiors after his rescue, he estimated the size of the Taliban force to be around 20–35. Initial intel estimates were approximately 10–20. Official media reports from the military estimated the size of the Taliban force to be around 20, while in the Medal of Honor (MOH) citation for LT Michael P. Murphy, the Navy cited 30–40 enemies. In the Summary of Action related to the same MOH, the Navy cites an "enemy force of more than 50 anti-coalition militia". In his book, Victory Point: Operations Red Wings and Whalers – the Marine Corps' Battle for Freedom in Afghanistan, military journalist Ed Darack cites a military intelligence report stating the strength of the Taliban force to be 8–10, compared to the more than 200 claimed by Patrick Robinson in Lone Survivor. The military intelligence estimate cited by Darack is based on research sourced from intelligence reports, including aerial and eye-witness studies of the battlefield after the fact, some from the men sent in to rescue Luttrell, and HUMINT from Afghan intelligence.

Film adaptation

Major studios including Warner Bros., Sony Pictures, Paramount, DreamWorks, and Universal Pictures all put in bids for the film rights, with Universal eventually securing the rights in August 2007 for more than $2 million.

In a June 2012 interview about his new book, Service: A Navy SEAL at War, Luttrell was asked, "is a movie going to be made about Lone Survivor"? He replied, "We will start shooting this September [2012]. It will star Mark Wahlberg who I spoke to a couple of times by phone. I want to make sure that the movie is true to the book. Most people get their information from movies and TV and don't read, so I want to make sure this movie is as realistic as possible."

The film, Lone Survivor, stars Mark Wahlberg, Taylor Kitsch, Ben Foster, Emile Hirsch, Eric Bana, and Alexander Ludwig and was released on January 10, 2014. It was directed by Peter Berg.

References

2007 non-fiction books
Little, Brown and Company books
Books about military history
American non-fiction books
Non-fiction books adapted into films
War on Terror books
Books about the United States Navy SEALs